Lost Lake is an unincorporated community in the towns of Calamus and Westford, Dodge County, Wisconsin, United States.

Notes

Unincorporated communities in Dodge County, Wisconsin
Unincorporated communities in Wisconsin